In theoretical physics, the composition of two non-collinear Lorentz boosts results in a Lorentz transformation that is not a pure boost but is the composition of a boost and a rotation. This rotation is called Thomas rotation, Thomas–Wigner rotation or Wigner rotation. The rotation was discovered and proved by Ludwik Silberstein in his 1914 book 'Relativity', rediscovered by Llewellyn Thomas in 1926, and rederived by Wigner in 1939. Wigner acknowledged Silberstein. If a sequence of non-collinear boosts returns an object to its initial  velocity, then the sequence of Wigner rotations can combine to produce a net rotation called the Thomas precession.

There are still ongoing discussions about the correct form of equations for the Thomas rotation in different reference systems with contradicting results. Goldstein:
The spatial rotation resulting from the successive application of two non-collinear Lorentz transformations have been declared every bit as paradoxical as the more frequently discussed apparent violations of common sense, such as the twin paradox.
Einstein's principle of velocity reciprocity (EPVR) reads
We postulate that the relation between the coordinates of the two systems is linear.
With less careful interpretation, the EPVR is seemingly violated in some models. There is, of course, no true paradox present.

Let it be u the velocity in which the lab reference frame moves respect an object called A and let it be v the velocity in which another object called B is moving, measured from the lab reference frame. If u and v are not aligned the relative velocities of these two bodies will not be opposite, that is  since there is a rotation between them

The velocity that A will measure on B will be:

The Lorentz factor for the velocities that either A sees on B or B sees on A:

The angle of rotation can be calculated in two ways:

Or:

And the axis of rotation is:

Setup of frames and relative velocities between them

Two general boosts
When studying the Thomas rotation at the fundamental level, one typically uses a setup with three coordinate frames, . Frame  has velocity  relative to frame , and frame  has velocity  relative to frame .

The axes are, by construction, oriented as follows. The velocity   makes the same angles with respect to coordinate axes in both the primed and unprimed systems. This does not represent a snapshot taken in any of the two frames of the combined system at any particular time, as should be clear from the detailed description below.

This is possible, since a boost in, say, the positive , preserves orthogonality of the coordinate axes. Each rotation retains the property that the spatial coordinate axes are orthogonal. The fact that coordinate axes are non-parallel in this construction after two consecutive non-collinear boosts is a precise expression of the phenomenon of Thomas rotation.

and

is the Lorentz factor of the velocity  (the vertical bars  indicate the magnitude of the vector). In the present context, all velocities are best thought of as relative velocities of frames unless otherwise specified. The result  is then the relative velocity of frame  relative to a frame .

The Lorentz factor  of both composite velocities are equal,

and the norms are equal under interchange of velocity vectors

Since the two possible composite velocities have equal magnitude, but different directions, one must be a rotated copy of the other. More detail and other properties of no direct concern here can be found in the main article.

Reversed configuration
Consider the reversed configuration, namely, frame  moves with velocity  relative to frame , and frame , in turn, moves with velocity  relative to frame .

One finds . While they are equal in magnitude, there is an angle between them. For a single boost between two inertial frames, there is only one unambiguous relative velocity (or its negative). For two boosts, the peculiar result of two inequivalent relative velocities instead of one seems to contradict the symmetry of relative motion between any two frames. Which is the correct velocity of  relative to ? Since this inequality may be somewhat unexpected and potentially breaking EPVR, this question is warranted.

Formulation in terms of Lorentz transformations

Two boosts equals a boost and rotation
The answer to the question lies in the Thomas rotation, and that one must be careful in specifying which coordinate system is involved at each step. While this can be hard to imagine since both pairs  and  have parallel coordinate axes, it is easy to explain mathematically.

Velocity addition does not provide a complete description of the relation between the frames. One must formulate the complete description in terms of Lorentz transformations corresponding to the velocities. A Lorentz boost with any velocity  (magnitude less than ) is given symbolically by

where the coordinates and transformation matrix are compactly expressed in block matrix form

The boost matrix is a symmetric matrix. The inverse transformation is given by

It is clear that to each admissible velocity  there corresponds a pure Lorentz boost,

Velocity addition  corresponds to the composition of boosts  in that order. Notice succeeding operators act on the left in any composition of operators, so  should be interpreted as a boost with velocities  then , not  then . Performing the Lorentz transformations by block matrix multiplication,

the composite transformation matrix is

and, in turn,

The 3×3 matrix  will turn out to have geometric significance.

The inverse transformations are

and the composition amounts to a negation and exchange of velocities,

This is not the same as the original matrix, so the composite Lorentz transformation matrix is not symmetric, and thus not a single boost. This, in turn, translates to the incompleteness of velocity composition from the result of two boosts; symbolically,

To make the description complete, it is necessary to introduce a rotation, before or after the boost. This rotation is the Thomas rotation. A rotation is given by

where the 4×4 rotation matrix is

Also, the right-handed convention for the spatial coordinates is used (see orientation (vector space)), so that rotations are positive in the anticlockwise sense according to the right-hand rule, and negative in the clockwise sense. With these conventions; the rotation matrix rotates any 3d vector about the axis  through angle  anticlockwise (an active transformation), which has the equivalent effect of rotating the coordinate frame clockwise about the same axis through the same angle (a passive transformation).

The rotation matrix is an orthogonal matrix, its transpose equals its inverse, and negating either the angle or axis in the rotation matrix corresponds to a rotation in the opposite sense, so the inverse transformation is readily obtained by

A boost followed or preceded by a rotation is also a Lorentz transformation, since these operations leave the spacetime interval invariant. The same Lorentz transformation has two decompositions for appropriately chosen rapidity and axis-angle vectors;

and if these are two decompositions are equal, the two boosts are related by

so the boosts are related by a matrix similarity transformation.

It turns out the equality between two boosts and a rotation followed or preceded by a single boost is correct: the rotation of frames matches the angular separation of the composite velocities, and explains how one composite velocity applies to one frame, while the other applies to the rotated frame. The rotation also breaks the symmetry in the overall Lorentz transformation making it nonsymmetric.

Altogether, two different orderings of two boosts means there are two inequivalent transformations. Each of these can be split into a boost then rotation, or a rotation then boost, doubling the number of inequivalent transformations to four. The inverse transformations are equally important; they provide information about what the other observer perceives. In all, there are eight transformations to consider, just for the problem of two Lorentz boosts. In summary, with subsequent operations acting on the left, they are

Matching up the boosts followed by rotations, in the original setup, an observer in  notices  to move with velocity  then rotate clockwise (first diagram), and because of the rotation an observer in Σ′′ notices  to move with velocity  then rotate anticlockwise (second diagram). If the velocities are exchanged an observer in  notices  to move with velocity  then rotate anticlockwise (third diagram), and because of the rotation an observer in  notices  to move with velocity  then rotate clockwise (fourth diagram).

The cases of rotations then boosts are similar (no diagrams are shown). Matching up the rotations followed by boosts, in the original setup, an observer in  notices  to rotate clockwise then move with velocity , and because of the rotation an observer in  notices  to rotate anticlockwise then move with velocity . If the velocities are exchanged an observer in  notices  to rotate anticlockwise then move with velocity , and because of the rotation an observer in  notices  to rotate clockwise then move with velocity .

Finding the axis and angle of the Thomas rotation
The above formulae constitute the relativistic velocity addition and the Thomas rotation explicitly in the general Lorentz transformations. Throughout, in every composition of boosts and decomposition into a boost and rotation, the important formula

Taking the trace of the equation gives

In both frames Σ and Σ′′, for every composition and decomposition, another important formula

holds.

The magnitude of this pseudovector is neither interesting nor important, only the direction is, so it can be normalized into the unit vector

which still completely defines the direction of the axis without loss of information.

The rotation is simply a "static" rotation and there is no relative rotational motion between the frames, there is relative translational motion in the boost. However, if the frames accelerate, then the rotated frame rotates with an angular velocity. This effect is known as the Thomas precession, and arises purely from the kinematics of successive Lorentz boosts.

Finding the Thomas rotation 

In principle, it is pretty easy. Since every Lorentz transformation is a product of a boost and a rotation, the consecutive application of two pure boosts is a pure boost, either followed by or preceded by a pure rotation. Thus, suppose

The coordinates of events are related by

Inverting this relation yields

or

Set  Then  will record the spacetime position of the origin of the primed system,

or

But

Multiplying this matrix with a pure rotation will not affect the zeroth columns and rows, and

which could have been anticipated from the formula for a simple boost in the -direction, and for the relative velocity vector

(Of course,  can also be found using velocity addition per above.) From , construct .

With the ansatz

one finds by the same means

Finding a formal solution in terms of velocity parameters  and  involves first formally multiplying , formally inverting, then reading off  form the result, formally building  from the result, and, finally, formally multiplying . It should be clear that this is a daunting task, and it is difficult to interpret/identify the result as a rotation, though it is clear a priori that it is. It is these difficulties that the Goldstein quote at the top refers to. The problem has been thoroughly studied under simplifying assumptions over the years.

Group theoretical origin

Another way to explain the origin of the rotation is by looking at the generators of the Lorentz group.

Boosts from velocities 
The passage from a velocity to a boost is obtained as follows. An arbitrary boost is given by

where  is a triple of real numbers serving as coordinates on the boost subspace of the Lie algebra  spanned by the matrices

The vector

is called the boost parameter or boost vector, while its norm is the rapidity. Here  is the velocity parameter, the magnitude of the vector . 

While for  one has , the parameter  is confined  within , and hence . Thus

It is endowed with a hyperbolic geometry described in the linked article.

Commutators
The generators of boosts, in different directions do not commute. This has the effect that two consecutive boosts is not a pure boost in general, but a rotation preceding a boost.

Consider a succession of boosts in the x direction, then the y direction, expanding each boost to first order

then

and the group commutator is

Three of the commutation relations of the Lorentz generators are

where the bracket  is a binary operation known as the commutator, and the other relations can be found by taking cyclic permutations of x, y, z components (i.e. change x to y, y to z, and z to x, repeat).

Returning to the group commutator, the commutation relations of the boost generators imply for a boost along the x then y directions, there will be a rotation about the z axis. In terms of the rapidities, the rotation angle  is given by

equivalently expressible as

Spacetime diagrams for non-collinear boosts
The familiar notion of vector addition for velocities in the Euclidean plane can be done in a triangular formation, or since vector addition is commutative, the vectors in both orderings geometrically form a parallelogram (see "parallelogram law"). This does not hold for relativistic velocity addition; instead a hyperbolic triangle arises whose edges are related to the rapidities of the boosts. Changing the order of the boost velocities, one does not find the resultant boost velocities to coincide.

See also
Bargmann-Michel-Telegdi equation
Pauli–Lubanski pseudovector
Velocity-addition formula#Hyperbolic geometry

Footnotes

References

Sexl Urbantke mention on p. 39 Lobachevsky geometry needs to be introduced into the usual Minkowski spacetime diagrams for non-collinear velocities.
.

 Ferraro, R., & Thibeault, M. (1999). "Generic composition of boosts: an elementary derivation of the Wigner rotation". European journal of physics 20(3):143.

 (free access)

 Thomas L.H The kinematics of an electron with an axis,Phil. Mag. 7, 1927 http://www.clifford.org/drbill/csueb/4250/topics/thomas_papers/Thomas1927.pdf
 Silberstein L. The Theory of Relativity, MacMillan 1914

Further reading
Relativistic velocity space, Wigner rotation, and Thomas precession (2004) John A. Rhodes and Mark D. Semon
The Hyperbolic Theory of Special Relativity (2006) by J.F. Barrett

Special relativity
Coordinate systems
Theory of relativity
Theoretical physics
Mathematical physics